The Rosiwal scale is a hardness scale in mineralogy, with its name given in memory of the Austrian geologist August Karl Rosiwal. The Rosiwal scale attempts to give more quantitative values of scratch hardness, unlike the Mohs scale which is a qualitative measurement with relative values. 

The Rosiwal method (also called the Delesse-Rosiwal method) is a method of petrographic analysis and is performed by scratching a polished surface under a known load using a scratch-tip with a known geometry. The hardness is calculated by finding the volume of removed material, but this measurement can be difficult and must sample a large enough number of grain in order to have statistical significance.

Rosiwal scale values 

Measures the scratch hardness of a mineral expressed on a quantitative scale. These measurements must be performed in a laboratory, since the surfaces must be flat and smooth. The base value of the Rosiwal scale is defined as corundum set to 1000 (unitless).

See also 
 Hardness
 August Karl Rosiwal
 Friedrich Mohs

References

Bibliography 
 The Great Encyclopedia of minerals 451 photographs, 520 pages 20'5 x 29'2 cm. Original: Artia, Prague 1986 Catalan version: Editorial Susaeta SA 1989,  (printed in Czechoslovakia)
 Accurate mineralogy. De Lapparent, A .: 1965 Paris
 Minerals and study how to Them. Dana L. Hurlbut, S .: New York 1949
 Schöne und seltene Mineral. Hofmann and F. Karpinski, J .: 1980 Leipzig
 CORDUANT, William S. "The Hardness of Minerals and Rocks".  Lapidary Digest  c. 1990.

External links 
 hardness minerals
 Geotopo XXI:Description of program content 
 hardness and toughness 
 Glossary of technical mining

Materials science
Mineralogy
Hardness tests